Leocísio Júlio Sami (born 18 December 1988) is a Bissau-Guinean professional footballer who plays as a forward.

Club career
Born in Bissau, Sami played the vast majority of his professional career in Portugal, finishing his development at S.L. Benfica. In his first two years as a senior he alternated between the Segunda Liga and the third division, representing Eléctrico F.C. and C.D. Aves.

Sami signed with C.S. Marítimo in the 2009 summer, appearing for both the first and second teams during his four-year spell in the island of Madeira. Late into the 2010 January transfer window he was loaned to second-tier side C.D. Fátima, which eventually avoided relegation. On 18 August 2013, his only Primeira Liga goal of the season helped his parent club defeat Benfica 2–1.

On 29 May 2014, free agent Sami joined FC Porto on a four-year contract. He never appeared for them in competitive matches, however, being consecutively loaned to S.C. Braga, Vitória S.C. and Turkish Süper Lig's Akhisar Belediyespor. His tenure at the Estádio Municipal de Braga was curtailed in January 2015, due to a run-in with manager Sérgio Conceição.

In February 2017, still owned by Porto, Sami moved to F.C. Arouca in the Portuguese top flight. On 3 July, he returned to Aves on a two-year contract.

International career
Sami was selected for the 2017 Africa Cup of Nations by manager Baciro Candé. During the tournament in Gabon, which ended in group stage exit, he featured 24 minutes in the 1–2 loss to Cameroon.

Career statistics

Club

International

Honours
Aves
Taça de Portugal: 2017–18

References

External links

1988 births
Living people
Portuguese people of Bissau-Guinean descent
Bissau-Guinean emigrants to Portugal
Sportspeople from Bissau
Bissau-Guinean footballers
Portuguese footballers
Association football forwards
Primeira Liga players
Liga Portugal 2 players
Segunda Divisão players
C.D. Aves players
C.S. Marítimo players
C.D. Fátima players
FC Porto players
S.C. Braga players
Vitória S.C. players
F.C. Arouca players
C.D. Cova da Piedade players
Süper Lig players
Akhisarspor footballers
Guinea-Bissau international footballers
2017 Africa Cup of Nations players
Bissau-Guinean expatriate footballers
Expatriate footballers in Turkey
Bissau-Guinean expatriate sportspeople in Turkey